Le Sap is a former commune in the Orne department in north-western France. On 1 January 2016, it was merged into the new commune of Sap-en-Auge.

Heraldry

References

See also
 Communes of the Orne department

Sap